For a village and mandal in Srikakulam, see Ponduru.

Ponduru is a village in Tanguturu mandal of Prakasam district in Andhra Pradesh, India.

Geography
It has an average elevation of 11 meters (39 feet).

References

Villages in Prakasam district